Shelimak (also Romanized as Shelīmak and Shalīmak; also known as Shalmak and Shīlmak) is a village in Farim Rural District, Dodangeh District, Sari County, Mazandaran Province, Iran. At the 2006 census, its population was 68, in 34 families.

References 

Populated places in Sari County